Edvard Bull may refer to:

 Edvard Bull, Sr. (1881–1932), Norwegian historian and politician
 Edvard Bull, Jr. (1914–1986), Norwegian historian
 Edvard Isak Hambro Bull (1845–1925), Norwegian physician
 Edvard Hagerup Bull (1855–1938), Norwegian judge and politician
 Edvard Hagerup Bull (composer) (1922–2012), Norwegian composer